The 2022–2023 mpox outbreak in Austria is part of the larger outbreak of human mpox caused by the West African clade of the monkeypox virus. Austria is the fifteenth country outside of Africa to experience an endemic mpox outbreak. The first case was reported in Vienna, Austria, on May 22, 2022. As of December 2nd, Austria has confirmed a total of 327 cases.

Background 

An ongoing outbreak of mpox was confirmed on May 6, 2022, beginning with a British resident who, after travelling to Nigeria (where the disease is endemic), presented symptoms consistent with mpox on April 29, 2022. The resident returned to the United Kingdom on May 4, creating the country's index case of the outbreak. The origin of several of the cases of mpox in the United Kingdom is unknown. Some monitors saw community transmission taking place in the London area as of mid-May, but it has been suggested that cases were already spreading in Europe in the previous months.

Transmission 

A large portion of those infected were believed to have not recently traveled to areas of Africa where mpox is normally found, such as Nigeria, the Democratic Republic of the Congo as well as central and western Africa. It is believed to be transmitted by close contact with sick people, with extra caution for those individuals with lesions on their skin or genitals, along with their bedding and clothing. The CDC has also stated that individuals should avoid contact and consumption of dead animals such as rats, squirrels, monkeys and apes along with wild game or lotions derived from animals in Africa.

In addition to more common symptoms, such as fever, headache, swollen lymph nodes, and rashes or lesions, some patients have also experienced proctitis, an inflammation of the rectum lining. CDC has also warned clinicians to not rule out mpox in patients with sexually transmitted infections since there have been reports of co-infections with syphilis, gonorrhea, chlamydia, and herpes.

History 

The first known case was detected in on May 22, 2022, with a 35-year-old man in Vienna, Austria. The person was hospitalized in Vienna. There, he tested positive for mpox, becoming the first case in Austria.

Two weeks after the man tested positive, additional cases were reported in Austria days later and more are being quarantined. As of August 10, there are 175 cases and no suspected cases.

Till 22 August 2022, there have been 217 confirmed cases of mpox in Austria.

Responses and reactions
Hospitals have also begun making their own preparations to help control the current mpox outbreak, including screening patients, increasing decontamination and cleaning procedures, and wearing appropriate safety gear (Personal protective equipment / Medical gown) when interacting with infected patients.

Austria also published a set of guidelines in hopes of containing the disease in the country.
A three week quarantine was set into place for infected patients. Isolation can be performed at home or at hospital, depending on the state of health of the patient, according to the Ministry of Health.

See also

 2022–2023 mpox outbreak
 2022–2023 mpox outbreak in Germany
 2022–2023 mpox outbreak in Switzerland

Notes

References

Austria
Mpox
Mpox

Monk